Ivanovo Oblast is a federal subject of Russia (an oblast). It had a population of 927,828 as of the 2021 Russian Census.

Its three largest cities are Ivanovo (the administrative center), Kineshma, and Shuya. The principal center of tourism is Plyos. The Volga River flows through the northern part of the oblast.

History

Early in its history, the Ivanovo region was a melting pot between different populations like Russians, Europeans, Asians, and others. Various ancient Uralian and ancient Slavic tribes inhabited the area.

Ivanovo Industrial Oblast was established on October 1, 1929. On March 11, 1936, a part of it became the modern Ivanovo Oblast while the remainder was split off to create Yaroslavl Oblast. On 21 May 1998 Ivanovo Oblast alongside Amur, Kostroma, Voronezh Oblasts, and the Mari El Republic signed a power-sharing agreement with the federal government, granting it autonomy. This agreement would be abolished on 26 February 2002.

Geography
Ivanovo Oblast shares borders with Kostroma Oblast (N), Nizhny Novgorod Oblast (E), Vladimir Oblast (S), and Yaroslavl Oblast (W).
The climate of Ivanovo Oblast is continental, with long, cold winters, and short, warm summers. Although larger than several of Russia's republics, Ivanovo Oblast is the smallest oblast by land area in Russia.

Politics
During the Soviet period, the high authority in the oblast was shared between three persons: the first secretary of the Ivanovo CPSU Committee (who in reality had the greatest authority), the chairman of the oblast Soviet (legislative power), and the Chairman of the oblast Executive Committee (executive power). Since 1991, CPSU has lost all power, when the head of the oblast administration, and eventually the governor, was appointed/elected alongside an elected regional parliament.

The Charter of Ivanovo Oblast is the fundamental law of the region. The Legislative Assembly of Ivanovo Oblast is the province's standing legislative (representative) body. The Legislative Assembly exercises its authority by passing laws, resolutions, and other legal acts and by supervising the implementation and observance of the laws and other legal acts passed by it. The highest executive body is the Oblast Government, which includes territorial executive bodies such as district administrations, committees, and commissions that facilitate development and run the day-to-day matters of the province. The Oblast administration supports the activities of the Governor who is the highest official and acts as guarantor of the observance of the oblast Charter under the Constitution of Russia.

Demographics
Population:

Settlements

2012
Births: 11 581 (11.0 per 1000)
Deaths: 17 679 (16.8 per 1000) 
Total fertility rate: 2009 - 1.44 | 2010 - 1.40 | 2011 - 1.41 | 2012 - 1.51 | 2013 - 1.55 | 2014 - 1.57 | 2015 - 1.63 | 2016 - 1.59(e)

Ethnic composition (2010):
Russians: 95.6%
Ukrainians: 0.8%
Tatars: 0.7%
Armenians: 0.4%
Azeris: 0.3%
Others: 2.2%
54,882 people were registered from administrative databases, and could not declare an ethnicity. It is estimated that the proportion of ethnicities in this group is the same as that of the declared group.

Religion

According to a 2012 survey 46.5% of the population of Ivanovo Oblast adheres to the Russian Orthodox Church, 8.4% are Orthodox Christian believers who don't belong to church or are members of non-Russian Orthodox churches, 1.8% are unaffiliated generic Christians, 0.5% of the population are adherents of the Slavic native faith (Rodnovery) movement, and 0.5% are Muslims. In addition, 28.1% of the population declares to be "spiritual but not religious", 12.9% is atheist, and 1.3% follows other religions or did not give an answer to the question.

The largest religious centre in the region is the Shartoma Monastery.

Administrative divisions

See also
List of Chairmen of the Ivanovo Oblast Duma
Government of Ivanovo Oblast

References

Notes

Sources

Администрация Ивановской области (Administration of Ivanovo Oblast). "Ивановская область. Административно-территориальное деление по состоянию на 1 января 2001 г." (Ivanovo Oblast. Administrative-Territorial Structure as of January 1, 2001). Иваново, 2001.

External links

 
States and territories established in 1936
1936 establishments in the Soviet Union